Quehanna Motivational Boot Camp is a mixed-sex six-month, military-style boot camp program operated by the Pennsylvania Department of Corrections in rural Clearfield County.

The creation of Quehanna
Quehanna was created in the 1990s as the department's first boot camp, using both federal and state funds. The camp opened in June 1992, during the Robert P. Casey administration.

The program
Inmates are assigned to the boot camp from their designated diagnostic centers (State Correctional Institution - Camp Hill or State Correctional Institution – Muncy), where they take a battery of strength tests. The program lasts six months, and involves intense physical activity and strict discipline. Vocational training and substance abuse counseling services, as well as counseling is provided. After successful completion of the program, the inmate is released on parole.

See also
List of Pennsylvania state prisons

References

External links
Penna. Department of Corrections - Quehanna Motivational Boot Camp

Buildings and structures in Clearfield County, Pennsylvania
Prisons in Pennsylvania
1992  establishments in Pennsylvania